Manikchak College, established in 2014, is an undergraduate general and honours degree college in Manikchak in Maldah district. Manikchak college was constructed by North Bengal Development Board of Government of West Bengal. Presently it offers undergraduate courses in arts. It is affiliated to University of Gour Banga. This college is located in Mathurapur, 35 km from District Headquarter Malda.

Departments

Arts
 Bengali
English
History
Philosophy
Political science
Sanskrit
Sociology

See also

References

External links
Manikchak College
University of Gour Banga
University Grants Commission
National Assessment and Accreditation Council

Colleges affiliated to University of Gour Banga
Educational institutions established in 2014
Universities and colleges in Malda district
2014 establishments in West Bengal